John Lithgow is an American actor, musician, poet, author, comedian and singer. He made his film debut in the comedy-drama Dealing: Or the Berkeley-to-Boston Forty-Brick Lost-Bag Blues (1972). He has since then appeared in over 50 films, countless television projects and on stage. Lithgow's first appearance on stage came in 1973, in a Broadway production of The Changing Room by David Storey, for which he won a Tony Award for Best Performance by a Featured Actor in a Play and a Drama Desk Award. Some of his other theater work he performed in were My Fat Friend (1974), Trelawny of the 'Wells' (1975) and the 1976 plays A Memory of Two Mondays / 27 Wagons Full of Cotton, Secret Service and Boy Meets Girl. Lithgow subsequently acted in films such as Obsession (1976), The Big Fix (1978), the 1979 films All That Jazz with Roy Scheider and Rich Kids, Blow Out (1981) starring John Travolta, and I'm Dancing as Fast as I Can (1982).

Lithgow's film breakthrough came after playing a transgender woman, Roberta Muldoon, who was a former football player, in a supporting role in the comedy-drama The World According to Garp (1982) with Robin Williams. Lithgow was nominated for an Academy Award for Best Supporting Actor for his role. He then portrayed an airplane passenger who suffers from aviophobia in Twilight Zone: The Movie (1983). Later the same year, Lithgow went on to play a science professor in the television disaster film The Day After, which won him an Emmy Award nomination for Outstanding Supporting Actor in a Miniseries or Special. As 1983 came to a close, he also featured in Terms of Endearment, where he played the role of a banker with Shirley MacLaine, Debra Winger and Jack Nicholson, thus earning Lithgow his second Academy Award nomination in the same category. In addition, Lithgow had a string of main and supporting roles during the 1980s, notably in the 1984 films Footloose, The Adventures of Buckaroo Banzai Across the 8th Dimension, 2010, Santa Claus: The Movie, The Manhattan Project (1986) and Harry and the Hendersons (1987).

The 1990s saw Lithgow continue to appear in various Hollywood films, namely Ricochet (1991) opposite Denzel Washington, Raising Cain (1992), Cliffhanger (1993) starring Sylvester Stallone and The Pelican Brief (1993), where he was reunited with Washington. He was cast in a main role in the 1996 television sitcom 3rd Rock from the Sun, where he played a high-ranking commander of an alien unit of four who have been sent to Earth to retrieve information under the disguise as a university professor. The show spanned over 100 episodes, during which Lithgow won one Golden Globe and three Emmy Awards for his role, before ending in 2001. That same year, he became the character of Lord Farquaad in the animated fantasy-comedy film Shrek (2001) Other roles Lithgow appeared in during the 2000s were The Life and Death of Peter Sellers (2004) with Geoffrey Rush, where he portrayed the famed director, screenwriter and producer Blake Edwards, Kinsey (2004) and Dreamgirls (2006). Lithgow also starred in the short-lived sitcom Twenty Good Years (2006). In 2009, he joined the cast of crime show Dexter as Arthur Mitchell, a family man who lives a double life as a serial killer. He appeared in a total of twelve episodes as the main antagonist on the fourth season, and for his performance, he won his second Golden Globe and fifth Emmy Award. Lithgow's later roles during the 2010s includes the science fiction film Rise of the Planet of the Apes (2011), the sitcom How I Met Your Mother (2005–14), where he performed as a guest star in four episodes in the role as the father of executive Barney Stinson, as the voice of Percy the White Rabbit in ABC's fantasy-drama and spin-off program Once Upon a Time in Wonderland (2013–14), and the 2014 films Love Is Strange, alongside fellow co-star Alfred Molina, The Homesman, and Interstellar. Lithgow can be seen as Winston Churchill in the television drama series The Crown (2016).

Film

Television

Radio

Narrator

Theatre

Audio drama

See also 
 List of awards and nominations received by John Lithgow

Notes

References 

Male actor filmographies
American filmographies
John Lithgow